Abha Mahato (born 27 October 1964) is an Indian parliamentarian from Jamshedpur, Jharkhand.

Personal life
Mahato was born in Deoghar (then in Bihar state) in 1964. She studied at Deoghar College (Bhagalpur University) from where she graduated with B.A. (Hons.) in Political Science.

She married Shri Shailendra Mahato, a former member of Lok Sabha on 27 June 1989 and 1991 of Jamshedpur. They have two sons.

Political career
Mahato was elected to the 12th and 13th Lok Sabha from Jamshedpur  as a member of Bharatiya Janata Party. She has been a member of various Parliamentary committees on commerce, coal, textiles, women's empowerment and on laws relating to women. She left Bharatiya Janata Party and joined Indian National Congress on 27 February 2019.

References

1964 births
India MPs 1998–1999
India MPs 1999–2004
Women in Jharkhand politics
Living people
Lok Sabha members from Jharkhand
People from Deoghar district
Bharatiya Janata Party politicians from Jharkhand
20th-century Indian women politicians
20th-century Indian politicians
21st-century Indian women politicians
21st-century Indian politicians
Indian National Congress politicians from Jharkhand
Tilka Manjhi Bhagalpur University alumni